Parliamentary elections were held in Portugal on 20 November 1836.

Electoral system
Elections had been held in July 1836 under the Constitutional Charter of 1826 and the Electoral Law of 7 August 1826. However, following the September Revolution, the 1822 constitution was restored. The constitution, together with decrees issued on 8 October and 10 November, created a 130-seat legislature with 122 members elected from multi-member constituencies on the mainland and islands and eight members elected in overseas colonies (six in single-member constituencies and two in a two-seat constituency). However, restrictions on the electoral franchise meant that only around 4.5% of the population were eligible to vote.

Results
The result was a victory for the moderate Setembristas, who won a majority of seats, with the previously ruling Cartistas winning only two seats.

Aftermath
The newly elected Cortes Gerais met on 2 January 1837.

References

Legislative elections in Portugal
1836 in Portugal
1836 elections in Europe
November 1836 events